The Al Fatiha Mosque is a mosque in Port-au-Prince, Ouest Department, Haiti.

History
The space where the mosque stands today was purchased in 1993. In 2010, the mosque was damaged by the 2010 Haiti earthquake. Later, the mosque was completely renovated and restored.
Till 1995 the mosque was upto one room without any proper name; it was a worship room. In 1995 Abdul Ali had donated his half land of his house for construction of proper mosque. The mosque map was designed by Muhammad Ameer (Pakistan National) and major portion of fund was also donated by him. Because of location of the land Mehrab (front centre place of Imam) is in the corner of the Mosque. This is a beauty of the mosque.

See also
 Islam in Haiti

References

Buildings and structures in Port-au-Prince
Mosques in Haiti